The Bornholm Tunnel is a proposed railway tunnel which would be built between the island of Bornholm, belonging to Denmark, and Scania in Sweden. The tunnel would provide a fixed link to the island, both using direct trains running from Copenhagen and with a motorail service to transport automobiles. The latter could be further reduced with construction of high-speed rail in southern Scania.

Present traffic
Today the island is served by ferries operated by Bornholmslinjen from Rønne, the main town on the island, to Ystad in Sweden, Køge in Denmark and Sassnitz in Germany. Travel time from Ystad to Rønne is two and a half hours with conventional ferries and one hour twenty minutes with fast ferries, with three to eight daily sailings combined. From Rønne to Køge takes five and a half hours and has a single daily sailing, while from Rønne to Sassnitz is seasonal and offered three to ten times per week and takes three and a half hours. DSB operates three daily train services branded as Intercity Bornholm from Copenhagen Central Station to Ystad Station, where passengers transfer to the ferries. The last direct DSB service will operate on 9 December 2017, after that local train services are to be used. Danish Air Transport operates flights from Bornholm Airport to Copenhagen Airport.

Cost
Costs for running the ferry service are DKK 400 million per year, of which DKK 150 million are subsidies. If the same user payment and subsidies was used to finance the tunnel, with a running time of 30 years, it would allow investments for DKK 10 billion. Estimates for the cost of the tunnel vary from DKK 5 to 50 billion.

Politics
The Danish organization Foreningen Bornholmtunnel and the Swedish organization Föreningen Stöd Bornholmstunneln collaborate to raise awareness about the importance of a tunnel between Bornholm and Scania.  The Bornholm province decided in April 2013 not to pay for a detailed investigation

References

External links
 Foreningen Bornholmtunnel
 Föreningen Stöd Bornholmstunneln

Buildings and structures in Bornholm
Railway tunnels in Denmark
Railway tunnels in Sweden
Proposed tunnels in Denmark
Proposed tunnels in Sweden
Rail transport in Skåne County
Connections across the Baltic Sea
Proposed railway tunnels in Europe